The first Lambán government was a regional government of Aragon led by President Javier Lambán. It was formed in July 2015 after the regional election and ended in August 2019 following the regional election.

Government

References

2015 establishments in Aragon
2019 disestablishments in Aragon
Cabinets established in 2015
Cabinets disestablished in 2019
Cabinets of Aragon